Mannina Maga is a 1968 Indian Kannada-language drama film directed by Geethapriya marking his debut as a solo in film-direction. The film stars Rajkumar, Kalpana and Jayakumari. Produced by Sudarshan Movies banner and written by Geethapriya, the film received rave reviews and went on to win National Film Award for Best Feature Film in Kannada and ran for more than 100 days in cinema halls.

Bangalore Mirror had reported that the attitude of the heroine of rejecting the city for a village life was rare, an affirmation of the possibility or, the difficulty, of sustaining community life in a city is more common.

Cast
 Rajkumar as Raja
 Kalpana as Mallika
 M. P. Shankar as Byranna
 Jayakumari
 H. R. Shastry
 Dikki Madhava Rao
 Vijayaprasad
 Ashwath Narayana
 B. Jaya
 Shanthamma
 Jayachitra

Production
Geetapriya finalised the script for his first directorial venture Mannina Maga. A house in Sadashivnagar was used for shooting. The film was also shot in a village Bijjawara and had booked accommodation in the Nandi Hills.

Soundtrack

The film's soundtrack tuned by Vijaya Bhaskar found immense popularity with "Bhagavanta Kaikotta" and "Idena Sabhyate" songs reaching the cult status with philosophical lyrics by Geethapriya. The album has five soundtracks.

Release
The film ran for more than 100 days in Bangalore's Kapali and Bharath theatres. It was Kapali theatre's opening film.

Awards
 1968 – National Film Award for Best Feature Film in Kannada
 Karnataka State Film Award for Best Film
 Karnataka State Film Award for Best Screenplay – Geethapriya

References

External sources
Mannina Maga at Raaga

1968 films
Indian drama films
Indian black-and-white films
Films scored by Vijaya Bhaskar
Best Kannada Feature Film National Film Award winners
1968 directorial debut films
1960s Kannada-language films
Films directed by Geethapriya